Laura Whittle (née Kenney; 27 June 1985) a Scottish long-distance runner.

Whittle was born to an English father and Scottish mother. Her father competed for Scotland in the marathon and cross-country running and motivated Laura to run in a club when she was 11 years old.

At the 2006 European Cross Country Championships she won a team gold medal in the under-23 women's race. She won the 5000 metre title at the 2007 European Athletics U23 Championships.
Whittle finished 38th at the 2008 IAAF World Cross Country Championships – Senior women's race. She also finished 8th at the 2009 IAAF World Athletics Final. Whittle also competed at the 2014 Commonwealth Games.

Personal life
She married 1500m runner Rob Whittle in 2010 and changed her name from Laura Kenney to Laura Whittle.

References

1985 births
Sportspeople from Blackpool
Living people
British female long-distance runners
Scottish female long-distance runners
Commonwealth Games competitors for Scotland
Athletes (track and field) at the 2014 Commonwealth Games
World Athletics Championships athletes for Great Britain
Athletes (track and field) at the 2016 Summer Olympics
Olympic athletes of Great Britain
Alumni of Loughborough University